Northerns (formerly North Eastern Transvaal and Northern Transvaal) has played first-class cricket in South Africa since December 1937. Its territory is the area north of Johannesburg, and it includes Pretoria. 

For the purposes of the SuperSport Series, Northerns has merged with Easterns (formerly Eastern Transvaal) to form the Titans.

Honours
 Currie Cup (0) –  ; shared (0) – 
 Standard Bank Cup (0) – 
 South African Airways Provincial Three-Day Challenge (1) – 2005–06; shared (1) – 2014–15
 South African Airways Provincial One-Day Challenge (1) – 2005–06

Club history
Northerns was called North Eastern Transvaal from December 1937 until April 1971, when it became Northern Transvaal until April 1997.  It had removed "Transvaal" from its name after the Transvaal became Gauteng, and a new province called Northern Transvaal (later renamed Limpopo) was created, that excluded Pretoria.  The team has been part of the Titans cricket team from October 2004.

Under the name North Eastern Transvaal the team played 134 first-class matches, winning 40, losing 57 and drawing 37. Under the names North Eastern Transvaal and Northern Transvaal the team played 325 first-class matches, winning 81, losing 142 and drawing 102. Altogether, up till late January 2017, the team had played 509 first-class matches, winning 150, losing 179 and drawing 180.

Venues
Venues have included:
 Berea Park, Pretoria (Dec 1937 – Jan 1986; previously used by Transvaal)
 Olympia Park, Springs (occasional venue Dec 1937 – Nov 1994; used once by Easterns in 1994)
 Hosking Park, Brakpan (temporary venue March 1946 – Nov 1946)
 Willowmoore Park, Benoni (Jan 1948 – Nov 1968; previously used by Transvaal; Easterns venue from 1996 to present)
 Caledonian Stadium, Pretoria (Dec 1951 – Dec 1952)
 Loftus Versfeld, Pretoria (occasional venue Dec 1956 – Oct 1959)
 Pietersburg Cricket Club A Ground (four matches 1983 – 1985)
 SuperSport Park, Centurion (main venue Dec 1986–present)
 Technikon Oval, Pretoria (two matches 1992 – 2003)
 Irene Villagers Cricket Club Ground, Irene (Dec 2015)

Squad
In April 2021, Cricket South Africa confirmed the following squad ahead of the 2021–22 season.

 Lizaad Williams
 Okhule Cele
 Theunis de Bruyn
 Dayyaan Galiem
 Gihahn Cloete
 Junior Dala
 Neil Brand
 Sibonelo Makhanya
 Corbin Bosch
 Aaron Phangiso
 Chris Morris
 Dewald Brevis
 Ayabulela Gqamane
 Jiveshen Pillay
 Grant Mokoena
 Simon Harmer
 Aiden Markram
 Lungi Ngidi
 Quinton de Kock
 Tabraiz Shamsi
 Dean Elgar
 Heinrich Klaasen

References

Sources
 South African Cricket Annual – various editions
 Wisden Cricketers' Almanack – various editions

External links
 North Eastern Transvaal at CricketArchive (1937–38 to 1970–71)
 Northern Transvaal at CricketArchive (1971–72 to 1996–97)
 Northerns at CricketArchive (1997–98 to present)

South African first-class cricket teams
Cricket in Gauteng